Ancylolomia laverna is a moth in the genus Ancylolomia in the family Crambidae. It was described by Stanisław Błeszyński in 1970. It is found in Myanmar.

References

Ancylolomia
Moths described in 1970
Moths of Asia